Earl Baxter Williams (January 27, 1903 – March 10, 1958) was a professional baseball player.

Williams was a catcher at Maryville College (-). He broke into organized baseball in 1924 with the Morristown Roosters of the Appalachian League. After four seasons of independent league ball, he was drafted by the Boston Braves from the Asheville Tourists of the South Atlantic League in the  rule 5 draft.

He made his major league debut on May 27, 1928. He was hitless in two at bats with a strikeout in three games. He continued to play minor league ball through .

Williams was a World War II veteran. He was a collector for the U.S. Internal Revenue Service for twenty years. He died at age 55 at St. Mary's Hospital in Knoxville, Tennessee from an apparent heart attack on March 10, 1958, and is buried at Highland Memorial Cemetery in Knoxville.

External links

Major League Baseball catchers
Boston Braves players
Knoxville Pioneers players
Augusta Tygers players
Greenville Spinners players
Knoxville Smokies players
Asheville Tourists players
Hartford Senators players
Providence Grays (minor league) players
Atlanta Crackers players
Baseball players from Tennessee
1903 births
1958 deaths